The 2009–10 Toto Cup Al was the twenty-eighth season of the third most important football tournament in Israel since its introduction and sixth under the current format. It was held in two stages. First, sixteen Premier League teams were divided into four groups. The winners and runners-up, were advanced to the Quarterfinals. Quarterfinals, Semifinals and Final was held as one-legged matches, with the Final played at the Ramat Gan Stadium.

The defending champions were Maccabi Tel Aviv, making it their third Toto Cup title overall.

On 26 January 2010, Beitar Jerusalem won the 2009–10 Toto Cup Al making it their second Toto Cup title overall.

Group stage
The matches were played from August 1 to December 15, 2009.

Group A

Group B

Group C

Group D

Elimination rounds

Quarterfinals

Semifinals
The draw for the Semifinals took place on 31 December 2009, with matches played two weeks later on 13 January 2010.

Final

See also
 2009–10 Toto Cup Leumit
 2009–10 Israeli Premier League
 2009–10 Israel State Cup

External links
 Official website  

Al
Toto Cup Al
Israel Toto Cup Al